German submarine U-3514 was a Type XXI U-boat (one of the "Elektroboote") of Nazi Germany's Kriegsmarine, built for service in World War II. She was ordered on 6 November 1943, and was laid down on 21 August 1944 at F Schichau GmbH, Danzig, as yard number 1659. She was launched on 21 October 1944, and commissioned under the command of Oberleutnant zur See Günther Fritze on 9 December 1944.

Design
Like all Type XXI U-boats, U-3514 had a displacement of  when at the surface and  while submerged. The submarine was powered by two MAN SE supercharged six-cylinder M6V40/46KBB diesel engines each providing , two Siemens-Schuckert GU365/30 double-acting electric motors each providing , and two Siemens-Schuckert silent running GV232/28 electric motors each providing .

U-3514 was fitted with six  torpedo tubes in the bow and four  C/30 anti-aircraft guns. She could carry twenty-three torpedoes or seventeen torpedoes and twelve mines. The complement was five officers and fifty-two men.

Service history
On 9 May 1945, U-3514 surrendered at Bergen, Norway. She was transferred to Lisahally, Northern Ireland on 6 June 1945, arriving on 8 June 1945.

U-3514 was held at Lisahally until January 1946, when she was taken to Moville. She was being held up in reserve just in case one of the Type XXI that had been transferred to the Soviets after the war did not arrive intact. Then on 7 February 1946, she was ordered to be part of Operation Deadlight. Two days later, on 9 February, she left Moville to be towed to her scuttling area, arriving on the morning of 12 February.  began the scuttling process at 09:36 using her QF  Mark V gun, "Squid" depth charges, and "Shark" shells, fired from the four-inch gun. U-3514 sank at 10:04, becoming the last U-boat sunk during Operation Deadlight.

References

Sources

External links
 

Type XXI submarines
U-boats commissioned in 1944
World War II submarines of Germany
1944 ships
Ships built in Danzig
Ships built by Schichau
Operation Deadlight
U-boats scuttled in 1946
Maritime incidents in 1946